Yuriy Viktorovych Zdebskyi (born 24 December 1972) is a Ukrainian former soldier and politician currently serving as a People's Deputy of Ukraine from Ukraine's 172nd electoral district since 29 August 2019. He is a member of Servant of the People.

Early life and career 
Yuriy Viktorovych Zdebskyi was born on 24 December 1972 in the settlement of Liubar, in Ukraine's Zhytomyr Oblast. Prior to his combat service, he was actively involved in border issues, and he participated in a 2008 meeting with the Government of Ukraine regarding agreements on Ukraine's borders.

When the War in Donbas began in 2014, Zdebskyi was serving as deputy head for personnel work of the Security Service of Ukraine's eastern department. He went to the front as a member of the State Border Guard Service, and participated in combat until 2016.

Political career 
During the 2019 Ukrainian presidential election, Zdebskyi was involved in the campaign of Volodymyr Zelenskyy, working in Ukraine's 170th electoral district (located in Kharkiv).

Zdebskyi ran in the 2019 Ukrainian parliamentary election as the candidate of Servant of the People (Zelenskyy's party) for People's Deputy of Ukraine in Ukraine's 172nd electoral district. He was successfully elected, defeating incumbent People's Deputy  with 43.61% to Mysyk's 43.17% - a difference of 0.44%, or 308 votes. An independent at the time of his election, Zdebskyi joined the Servant of the People parliamentary faction, as well as the Verkhovna Rada Committee on National Security, Defence, and Intelligence. He is also a member of the Slobozhanshchyna and "For Accelerated European Integration of Ukrainian Business" inter-factional associations.

References 

1972 births
Living people
Ninth convocation members of the Verkhovna Rada
Servant of the People (political party) politicians
Ukrainian military personnel of the war in Donbas